Cecilie Jørgensen (1814 - 1890) was a Norwegian (originally Danish) stage actress and opera singer. She was active at the Christiania Theatre in Oslo in 1835-63. She was married to the actor and opera singer Christian Jørgensen.

She belonged to the acting elite in Norway in the first half of the 19th-century, when the Christiania Theatre was the only standing stage in Norway, and dominated by actors of Danish origin. She is described as a very useful and able actor.  She is most known for her successful roles as aristocratic ladies in burgher comedies, but she was also a singer and able to perform when the theatre occasionally offered opera performances.

References 
 Blanc, Tharald Høyerup: Christiania theaters historie 1827-1877, J.W. Cappelen Christiania

1814 births
1890 deaths
19th-century Norwegian actresses
19th-century Norwegian women opera singers